The National Active and Retired Federal Employees Association (NARFE) is a nonprofit, 501(c)5 membership association dedicated to improving the benefits of active and retired federal employees, their spouses and survivors.

NARFE has some 175,000 members and over 800 NARFE chapters in almost every state within the United States, as well as chapters in Washington, D.C., Puerto Rico, Panama and the Philippines.  NARFE also offers electronic chapters to members who wish to receive their information electronically.  Most members of NARFE are covered under either the Civil Service Retirement System (CSRS, including CSRS Offset) or the Federal Employees Retirement System (FERS) or are spouses or surviving spouses of Federal employees.

Among items for which NARFE advocates include:
"extend the Premium Conversion rights that federal and postal employees have to federal annuitants", and
"Repeal the Social Security Government Pension Offset (GPO) and Windfall Elimination Provision (WEP)."
Through both of these acts, NARFE is trying to increase the pensions of retired federal workers.

NARFE legislative program
The legislative program of NARFE is made annually coming before each Congress. The program is divided into three categories in order to show their importance as NARFE legislative goals. The first is to preserve the goals already reached. The second is to provide benefits to the future members of NARFE. The third includes all other goals of NARFE.

Political contributions
According to OpenSecrets, in 2018 NARFE donated $850,750 to political candidates, of which 78% went to Democratic candidates and 21% to Republican candidates.

References

External links
 NARFE official website

Political advocacy groups in the United States
Seniors' organizations
Retirement in the United States